Mark Wallberg may refer to:

 Mark Wahlberg (born 1971), American actor and rapper
 Mark L. Walberg (born 1962), American television performer